Trevor Adamson is a country/gospel singer best known for his song Nyanpi Matilda, a Pitjantjatjara version of Waltzing Matilda. He is from Pukatja, South Australia and sings in both Pitjantjatjara and English. He was the subject of an episode of an ABC TV series, Six Australians.  Trevor Adamson also featured in episode #1008 of the NITV show "Pmarra Country", an Aboriginal tribute to the legendary Slim Dusty, in which Mr. Adamson performed his Pitjantjatjara language version of Slim Dusty's 1972 song "When the Rain Tumbles Down in July".

Discography
Godaku Walytja-Piti (Gods Family) (1982) with the Enabella children
Trust in the Lord (1985) - Imparja
Where I Belong (1989) - CAAMA
Waltzing Matilda (1994) - CAAMA
My Sunburnt Country (2009) - Pindaroo

References

Indigenous Australian musicians
Australian male singers
Australian songwriters
Australian guitarists
Living people
Musicians from South Australia
Year of birth missing (living people)
Australian male guitarists